William Morrison was a Scotland international rugby union player. He played at Centre.

Rugby Union career

Amateur career

He played for Edinburgh Academicals.

Provincial career

Morrison played for the Anglo-Scots in 1898. He also played for Edinburgh District that same season.

International career

He was capped once for Scotland in 1900.

References

1875 births
1944 deaths
Scottish rugby union players
Scotland international rugby union players
Edinburgh Academicals rugby union players
Rugby union players from Edinburgh
Scottish Exiles (rugby union) players
Edinburgh District (rugby union) players
Rugby union centres